Igorora is a town in Ibanda District, Greater Mbarara region, Ankole sub-region, Western Uganda.

Location

Overview
The town has been developed into a town council, making it the second town council in Ibanda District.

Population
The 2014 census established the population of Igorora as 5,863.

Points of interest
 A branch of EBO Financial Services (SACCO)
 Headquarters of Igorora Town Council.
 Igorora Police Station.
 Bash Tervan Hotel Ltd Igorora.
 Bash Oils ( Petrol Station).
 Igorora Town View Gardens.
 Selectors Pub and Lodges.
AK COSC STUDIO

References

Ibanda District
Populated places in Western Region, Uganda